Papanui High School (PHS) is a state secondary school located in Papanui, Christchurch, New Zealand. The school was founded as Papanui Technical College in 1936 and was officially renamed Papanui High School in 1949. The first principal of the school was Joseph Bell McBride.

In 2011 a new gymnasium and pool complex was introduced to the school's campus. It was opened in association with Christchurch City Council and was named in honour of Paralympian Graham Condon, who died in an accident involving a car while riding his hand-propelled bicycle. The Graham Condon Recreation and Sports Centre has become a very important part of the school community.

Located between the second largest mall in the city 'Northlands Mall' and Firestone, the school plays a large part in the wider community.

The current principal is Jeffrey Smith. In 2006 66% of Year 11 students gained NCEA Level 1.That figure lowered to 62% 2012, but increased to 82% in 2015. NCEA performance in Level 2 also reached the national average.

Notable alumni

 Shane Bond – cricketer
 Lewis Brown – rugby league player
 Andy Caddick – cricketer
 David Grundy - Hockey player, Olympian 619
 Michael Hurst – actor, director and writer
 George Naoupu – rugby union player
 Mark Priest - cricketer
 Melodie Robinson – rugby union player

References

Sources 

Chalklen, M. F., & Papanui High School Old Students' Association. (1986). The school at the terminus: A jubilee history of Papanui High School, 1936-1986. Papanui High School Old Students' Association. 

Educational institutions established in 1936
Secondary schools in Christchurch
1936 establishments in New Zealand